is a Japanese anime director.

Career
Kamiyama has worked regularly with the anime studio and production enterprise Production I.G, such as his work on Jin-Roh, Patlabor, Blood: The Last Vampire, and for whom he has directed the Ghost in the Shell: Stand Alone Complex anime television series, which was followed on into a second season, Ghost in the Shell: S.A.C. 2nd GIG and a TV movie, Ghost in the Shell: Stand Alone Complex - Solid State Society.

After working as a background artist for productions such as Akira and Kiki's Delivery Service, Kamiyama joined Team Oshii at Production I.G, contributing the screenplay of Blood: The Last Vampire and working as animation director for Jin-Roh. In 2002, Kamiyama made his directorial debut with MiniPato, followed by Ghost in the Shell: Stand Alone Complex and Ghost in the Shell: S.A.C. 2nd GIG. In 2007, after almost six years of work on the Stand Alone Complex world, he directed the TV series Guardian of the Sacred Spirit and Eden of the East.

On November 29, 2018, it was announced that Kamiyama and Shinji Aramaki would direct Blade Runner: Black Lotus, an anime for Adult Swim and Crunchyroll.

On August 2, 2021, it was announced that Kamiyama, both director and writer of the feature-length anime work, Eien no 831 (The Eternal 831) which was broadcast in January 2022 on Wowow.

Filmography

 DuckTales (1987), backgrounds
 Patlabor (1988–1989), backgrounds
 Burn Up! (1991), art director
 Hakkenden: Legend of the Dog Warriors (1990–1991, 1993–1995), art director
 Roujin Z (1991), assistant art director
 Genocyber (1994), art director
 Jin-Roh: The Wolf Brigade (1998), unit director
 Wild Arms: Twilight Venom (1999–2000), scripts for episodes 3, 10 and 21
 Medabots (1999–2000), storyboards for episodes 19, 34, 41, 48 and episode director for 34, 41, 48
 Popolocrois Story II (2000), storyboards
 Blood: The Last Vampire (2000), screenplay, planning assistance
 Mini Pato (2002), director
 Ghost in the Shell: Stand Alone Complex (2002–2003), director, series composition, script, storyboard, chief writer
 Ghost in the Shell: S.A.C. 2nd GIG (2004–2005), director, series composition, script, storyboard, chief writer
 Ghost in the Shell: Stand Alone Complex - Solid State Society (2006), director, script, storyboard
 Eat and Run: 6 Beautiful Grifters (2007), segment director
 Moribito: Guardian of the Spirit (2007), director, script
 Eden of the East (2009), director, series composition, script, storyboard, chief writer
 Eden of the East: Air Communication (2009), director, screenplay
 Eden of the East: The King of Eden (2009), director, screenplay
 Eden of the East: Paradise Lost (2010), director, screenplay
 Ghost in the Shell: Stand Alone Complex - Solid State Society 3D (2011), director, script, storyboard
 009 Re:Cyborg (2012), director, script
 Mou Hitotsu no Mirai o. (2014), director
 Cyborg 009 Call of Justice (2016), chief director
 Napping Princess (2017), director, screenplay
 Ultraman (2019–present), co-director with Shinji Aramaki
 Ghost in the Shell: SAC_2045 (2020–2022), co-director with Shinji Aramaki
Star Wars: Visions (2021) ("The Ninth Jedi")
 Blade Runner: Black Lotus (2021–2022), co-director with Shinji Aramaki
 Eien no 831 (2022), director
 The Lord of the Rings: The War of the Rohirrim (2024), director

References

External links
 Interview with Kenji Kamiyama
 
 

1966 births
Background artists
Anime directors
Japanese storyboard artists
Living people
People from Saitama Prefecture
Science fiction film directors